KULM may refer to:

 KULM-FM, a radio station (98.3 FM) licensed to Columbus, Texas, United States
 New Ulm Municipal Airport (ICAO code KULM)